Ratchadaphisek station is a Bangkok MRT station on the Blue Line, located under Ratchadaphisek Road. During construction, the station had been named Ratchada but MRTA changed to Ratchadaphisek, referring to the road of the same name. The station's symbol color is  pink.

Station structure

Platforms

References 

MRT (Bangkok) stations
Railway stations opened in 2004
2004 establishments in Thailand